A fall line refers to the line down a mountain or hill which is most directly downhill; that is, the direction a ball or other body would accelerate if it were free to move on the slope under gravity. Mathematically the fall line, the line of greatest slope, is the negative of the gradient (which points uphill) and perpendicular to the contour lines.

In mountain biking, a trail follows the "fall line" if it generally descends in the most downward direction, rather than traversing in a sideways direction. A skier is said to be "skiing the fall line" if they are moving generally down, making turns either side of the fall line, rather than moving across the slope.

See also
 Glossary of cycling
 Ridge line
 Topography
 Topographic profile
 Gradient descent

References

Mountain biking
Alpine skiing
Trails
Topography